Cabrobó is a city in the Brazilian state of Pernambuco, 536 km away from the state's capital, Recife. The city is located just to the north of a section of the São Francisco River that contains many archipelagos.

History
The Truká people had historically occupied the Ilha da Assunção archipelago of the São Francisco River in Cabrobó municipality.

Ponti, an extinct Jê language belonging to the Jeicó group, was once spoken on an island in the São Francisco River near the city of Quebrobó (Cabrobó).

Geography

 State - Pernambuco
 Region - Pernambucan San Francisco
 Boundaries - Terra Nova  (N);  Bahia state  (S);  Salgueiro and Belém de São Francisco  (E);  Orocó  (W)
 Area - 1658.08 km²
 Elevation - 325 m
 Hydrography - Terra Nova River
 Vegetation - Caatinga hiperxerófila.
 Climate - Semi arid (Sertão) hot and dry
 Annual average temperature - 26.2 c
 Distance to Recife - 536 km

Economy

The main economic activities in Cabrobó are based in general commerce and agribusiness, especially farming of goats, sheep, cattle, pigs;  and plantations of onions, cannabis, water melons and rice.

Economic Indicators

Economy by Sector
2006

Health Indicators

References

Municipalities in Pernambuco